Sydney Joy Romero (born March 8, 1997) is a former American softball player and current assistant coach for Duke. She previously played college softball for the Oklahoma Sooners, where she set numerous program records and led the Sooners to four consecutive Women's College World Series appearances from 2016 to 2019, and won the national championship as a Freshman in 2016 and Sophomore in 2017. She played professionally for the USSSA Pride of National Pro Fastpitch. She represented Mexico at the 2020 Summer Olympics.

Early life
Romero attended Vista Murrieta High School, where she was a three-time First-Team All-Southwestern League honoree, and was named a 2014 Underclass All-American.

College career
During her Freshman year in 2016, Romero played in 64 games, where she struck out just four times in 211 at-bats on the season, giving her the third-best strikeout ratio in program history at 52.75 at-bats per strikeout. She was named to the All-Big 12 Freshman Team, and named a NFCA Freshman of the Year finalist. During the 2016 Women's College World Series, Sydney and the Sooners faced her sister Sierra and the Michigan Wolverines during the second round. Sydney went 2-for-3, including a solo home run, with two runs scored, a walk and a stolen base in a 7–5 victory for the Sooners. During the finals of the World Series against Auburn, Romero hit a three-run home run in game 1 of the best-of-three championship series, to help the Sooners win the game, and lead the team to the championship.

During her Senior year in 2019, Romero finished the regular season leading the Big 12 Conference in batting average (.431), home runs (17), RBIs (51) and total bases (144), while ranking second in slugging percentage (.862), runs scored (55) and hits (72). She also led the nation with 176 total bases, and ranked second nationally with 90 hits. Her 176 total bases and 42 extra-base hits ranked second all-time in single-season Oklahoma program history. On May 10, 2019, Romero recorded her 57th career double to set a Sooners program record, surpassing the previous record of 56 set by Lisa Carey in 2001. Following an outstanding season, she was named the Big 12 Player of the Year, and was a top three finalist for the USA Softball Collegiate Player of the Year award. She was also named a unanimous All-Big 12 First Team selection, and a First-Team All-American. Romero finished her Sooner career as the leader in at-bats (853) and doubles (58) and tied for first with 13 sacrifice flies; second in hits (320), extra-base hits (121) and total bases (558); third in games played (258); fourth in RBIs (215); fifth in batting average (.375), runs scored (229) and home runs (54); sixth in assists (367) and seventh in slugging percentage (.654).

Professional career
On April 16, 2019, Romero was drafted third overall by the USSSA Pride in the 2019 NPF Draft. On June 11, 2019, she was signed to a two-year contract by the USSSA Pride. She was named the Player of the Week for the week ending July 28, 2019. During the week she went 7-for-13, with eight runs, one double, one home run, five RBI, two walks, and three stolen bases. She was named the Rookie of the Week for the week ending August 11, 2019. During the week she went 11-for-22, with four runs, two doubles, one home run, five RBI, two walks and a stolen base.

Coaching career
On September 18, 2019, Romero was named a student assistant for the Oklahoma Sooners softball program.

On July 1, 2022, Romero was named an assistant coach for the Duke Blue Devils softball program. She will serve as the team's hitting and infield coach.

Personal life
Romero is the daughter of Michael and Melissa Romero, and has three siblings. She is the younger sister of professional softball player Sierra Romero. Her brother, Mikey Romero was drafted in the first round, 24th overall, by the Boston Red Sox in the 2022 Major League Baseball Draft.

References

External links
Oklahoma bio

1997 births
Living people
American sportspeople of Mexican descent
Oklahoma Sooners softball players
Softball players from California
Sportspeople from San Diego
USSSA Pride players
Mexican softball players
Olympic softball players of Mexico
Softball players at the 2020 Summer Olympics